STS-89 was a Space Shuttle mission to the Mir space station flown by Space Shuttle  Endeavour, and launched from Kennedy Space Center, Florida on 22 January 1998.

Crew

Crew notes
STS-89 was originally scheduled to return Wendy B. Lawrence but returned David A. Wolf (Mir 24–25 / STS-86) and left Andrew Thomas on Mir. Thomas returned on STS-91.

Mission highlights

STS-89 launched on January 22, 1998 and was the eighth of nine planned missions to Mir and the fifth involving an exchange of U.S. astronauts. Astronaut David Wolf, who had been on Mir since late September 1997, was replaced by Astronaut Andrew Thomas. Thomas spent approximately 4 months on the orbiting Russian facility before returning to Earth when Discovery docked to Mir in late May during STS-91. 

Experiments and payloads
SPACEHAB Payloads included the Advanced X-Ray Detector (ADV XDT), Advanced Commercial Generic Bioprocessing Apparatus (ADV CGBA), EORF, Mechanics of Granular Materials (MGM) Experiment, Intra-Vehicular Radiation Environment Measurements by the Real-Time Radiation Monitor (RME-1312), Space Acceleration Measurement System (SAMS), VOA and the Volatile Removal Assembly prototype for the ISS Water Recovery System

In-cabin payloads included the Microgravity Plant Nutrient Experiment (MPNE), Shuttle Ionospheric Modification with Pulsed Local Exhaust (SIMPLEX), Closed Equilibrated Biological Aquatic System (CEBAS), TeleMedicine Instrumentation Pack (TMIP), Global Positioning System Development Test Objective (GPS DTO), Human Performance (HP) Experiment, MSD, EarthKAM, Orbiter Space Vision System (OSVS) Shuttle Condensate Collection (RME-1331), Thermo-Electric Holding Module (TEHM), Space Linear Acceleration Mass Measurement Device (DSO 914), Co-Culture Experiments (CoCult) and the Biochemistry of 3-D Tissue Engineering (BIO3D).

Getaway Special experiments included the University of Michigan G-093 – Vortex Ring Transit Experiment (VORTEX), the German Aerospace Center and University Giessen G-141 – Structure of Marangoni Convection in Floating Zones Payload, the German Aerospace Center and the Technical University of Clausthal G-145 Glass Fining Experiment and the Chinese Academy of Sciences G-432 canister containing 5 crystal growth and material sciences experiments.

Mission insignia
The insignia depicts Endeavour docked to Mir above the planet Earth. The white inside line in the shape of the number eight and the nine stars symbolize the flight's numerical designation in the Space Transportation System's mission sequence. The International Space Station is in the background.

See also

List of human spaceflights
List of Space Shuttle missions
Outline of space science

External links
 NASA mission summary 
 STS-89 Video Highlights 

Space Shuttle missions
Spacecraft launched in 1998